Robert Russell (born February 5, 1955) is a Canadian former professional ice hockey player.

Early life 
Russell was born in Toronto, Ontario. As a youth, he played in the 1967 Quebec International Pee-Wee Hockey Tournament with the Toronto Faustina minor ice hockey team.

Career 
Russell is an alumnus of the Sudbury Wolves and was a member of their first ever Ontario Hockey League team in 1972. He was selected in the sixth Round, 105th overall, in the 1975 NHL Amateur Draft by the Los Angeles Kings. He was also drafted in the ninth round, 117th overall in the 1975 WHA Amateur Draft by the Edmonton Oilers. He played two seasons in the World Hockey Association with the Edmonton Oilers. He is the current president of the Greater Metro Junior A Hockey League.

Statistics

References

External links

1955 births
Living people
Canadian ice hockey centres
Edmonton Oilers (WHA) draft picks
Edmonton Oilers (WHA) players
Greensboro Generals (SHL) players
Los Angeles Kings draft picks
Ice hockey people from Toronto
Sudbury Wolves players